Dr. Albert Hahl (1868, Gern - 1945) was a German colonial administrator. In 1897, he was acting Landeshauptmann of the German New Guinea Company and from 1902 to December 1917, was Governor of German New Guinea. In 1903 he founded the town of Rabaul, which became the capital of the colony. Hahl is featured in Christian Kracht's 2012 novel Imperium, which focuses on August Engelhardt.

Military service
30 Nov 1891 Hof, Bavaria, Germany Infantry lieutenant. The III Royal Bavarian Army Corps / III Bavarian AK (German: III. Königlich Bayerisches Armee-Korps) was a corps level command of the Royal Bavarian Army, part of the German Army, before and during World War I.

Marriage
Hahl married Luise Bartha Marie von Seckendorff [1875–1935] on 1 February, 1903 in Genoa, Liguria, Italy.

References

External links
 

1868 births
1945 deaths
People from Eggenfelden
People from the Kingdom of Bavaria
German Protestants
Colonial people of German New Guinea
History of Papua New Guinea
German military personnel of World War I